"Spania" (Greek:Σπάνια) is a platinum CD single by popular Greek artist Despina Vandi released in 1998 by Minos EMI. The single was totally composed by popular composer Phoebus. The CD single was a forerunner of the cd Profities which was released the next year and containing the two songs of the single.

Track listing

Music videos
"Spania"
"Oute Ena Efharisto"

Release history

Credits and personnel

Personnel
Christina Argiri - background vocals
Pavlos Diamantopoulos - bass
Hakan - saz
Giorgos Hatzopoulos - guitars (acoustic, twelve-string, electric)
Katerina Kiriakou - background vocals
Andreas Mouzakis - drums
Giannis Mpithikotsis - bouzouki, mandolin, baglama
Alex Panayi - background vocals
Phoebus - music, lyrics, keyboards, programming, orchestration
Giorgos Roilos - percussion
Despina Vandi - vocals
Thanasis Vasilopoulos - clarinet, ney
Alexandros Vourazelis - keyboards
Nikos Zervas - keyboards

Production
Thodoris Hrisanthopoulos - digital mastering
Vaggelis Siapatis - sound
Giorgos Stampolis - sound, computer editing
Achilleas Theofilou - production management
Manolis Vlahos - recording officer, sound, mixing
Alexandros Vourazelis - sound

Design
Ntinos Diamantopoulos - photo
Maria Pitsokou - artwork

Credits adapted from the album's liner notes.

Official remixes
Spania-Giatriko Flamenco Version 2002
In 2002, Tony Kontaxakis adapted and orchestrated a remix of the songs Spania and Giatriko. The remix was entitled Spania-Giatriko Flamenco Version 2002 and included on the CD single Ante Gia and on the Collector's Edition of CD Gia.

Cover versions
2000: Ivana - Kusno e (Σπάνια; Ивана - Късно е) (Bulgaria)
2002: Toše Proeski - Nemaš ni Blagodaram (You don't even thank me) (Ούτε ένα ευχαριστώ; Μeni hvala nijedno) (Republic of Macedonia)

References

Despina Vandi songs
1998 singles
Greek-language songs
Number-one singles in Greece
Music videos directed by Kostas Kapetanidis
Songs written by Phoebus (songwriter)
1998 songs
Minos EMI singles